Poker Night may refer to:
Poker Night at the Inventory, a poker video game developed by Telltale Games
Poker Night 2, a poker video game developed by Telltale games and a follow up to Poker Night at the Inventory
Poker Night Live, a live Internet poker show broadcast in the United Kingdom
"The Poker Night", the original title of "The Catastrophe of Success", an essay written by Tennessee Williams
Poker Night (film), a 2014 crime thriller movie starring Beau Mirchoff
Poker Night, a series on the website icebox.com